Harlan Ellison's Watching is a 1989 compilation of 25 years worth of essays and film reviews written by Harlan Ellison for Cinema magazine, the Los Angeles Free Press, Starlog magazine, and The Magazine of Fantasy and Science Fiction among others.

In the book, Ellison explains, in an entertaining introductory essay, how he became a film critic and his views on film criticism in general. At the time that many of these reviews were written, he was one of the few people who worked within the genres of science fiction, horror and fantasy to openly criticize some of its most popular works. Highlights include a thorough savaging of Star Wars Episode IV: A New Hope (entitled "Luke Skywalker is a Nerd and Darth Vader Sucks Runny Eggs"), wherein he describes it as "shallow" and "a film without soul, without a core," and writing that Gremlins "suffers from the dreaded Jerry Lewis Syndrome: it vacillates between a disingenuous homeliness and an egomaniacal nastiness."

Ellison also used his status within the industry to expose what he felt were unjust handlings of films like Brazil and Dune by their respective studios. He also championed obscure films that he felt were of exemplary quality, like Big Trouble in Little China, which had "some of the funniest lines spoken by any actor this year to produce a cheerfully blathering live-action cartoon that will give you release from the real pressures of your basically dreary lives" and Joe, which he said was "a visceral experience on a par with going black-belting with Bruce Lee. Joe will kick the shit out of you. It will set the blood slamming against your cranial walls. It will make you as cold as Ultima Thule."

For a few years after this book was published, Ellison continued to write a film criticism column for The Magazine of Fantasy and Science Fiction but these have yet to be compiled into book form.

Reaction
In his review for the New York Times, Robert Moss wrote, "In contrast to the detached, impersonal tone of the average film critic, Mr. Ellison pronounces almost exclusively at the top of his voice...His style routinely mixes a standard critical idiom with esoteric vocabulary, slang, a liberal use of obscenities and many homemade coinages."

Awards and honors
The book was a finalist for the 1990 Hugo Award for Best Non-Fiction Book.

References

External links
Bright Lights Film Journal review by Matthew Sorrento

Books about film
American essay collections
1989 non-fiction books
Books by Harlan Ellison
Books of film criticism